Note: Names that cannot be confirmed in Wikipedia database nor through given sources are subject to removal. If you would like to add a new name please consider writing about the person first. If a notable Romanian is missing and without article, please add your request for a new article here. However, this is not a list of all famous Romanians.

This is a list of some of the most prominent Romanians. It contains historical and important contemporary figures (athletes, actors, directors etc.).

Most of the people listed here are of Romanian ethnicity, whose native tongue is Romanian. There are also a few mentioned who were born in Romania and can speak Romanian, though not of Romanian ethnicity.

Historical and political figures

Medieval 
Alexander I the Good (1375–1432), Domn of Moldavia (1400–1432)
Basarab I the Founder (1270–1352), first independent Domn of Wallachia (1310–1352)
Michael the Brave (1558–1601), Domn of Wallachia (1593–1601), Domn of Moldavia (1600) and de facto ruler of Transylvania (1599–1600)
Mircea I the Elder (1355–1418), Domn of Wallachia (1386–1394, 1397–1418)
Neagoe Basarab V (1459–1521), Domn of Wallachia (1512–1521)
Nicolaus Olahus (1493–1568), Roman Catholic Archbishop of the Kingdom of Hungary
Stephen III the Great (1433–1504), Domn of Moldavia (1457–1504)
Vlad II Dracul (before 1395-1447), Domn of Wallachia (1436-1442, 1443-1447)
Vlad III the Impaler (1431–1477), Domn of Wallachia (1448, 1456–1462, 1476–1477)

Renaissance Age 
Dimitrie Cantemir, ruler of Moldavia, historian, writer, and music composer
Antioch Kantemir, poet and Russian ambassador 
Constantin Brancoveanu, Prince of Wallachia (1688-1714)

Modern era 
 Tudor Vladimirescu
 Prince Gheorghe Bibescu
 Prince Barbu Dimitrie Știrbei
 Prince Alexandru Ioan Cuza
 King Carol I of Romania
 King Ferdinand I of Romania 
 King Carol II of Romania
 King Michael I of Romania
 Queen Elizabeth of Romania
 Queen Marie of Romania

Politicians and militarymen 
Ion Antonescu, Prime Minister and Conducător (Leader) during World War II
Alexandru Averescu, general and politician
Nicolae Bălcescu, historian, revolutionary
Antoine Bibesco, diplomat, writer 
Gheorghe Grigore Cantacuzino, Prime Minister during the 1907 Romanian Peasants' revolt
Lascăr Catargiu 
Constantin Cristescu, general, Chief of Staff
Barbu Ștefănescu Delavrancea, former mayor of Bucharest
Ion Dragalina, general
Petre Dumitrescu, general
Octavian Goga, writer, former Prime Minister
Avram Iancu, revolutionary in 1848 Revolution
Take Ionescu, Prime Minister in interbellum Romania
Mugur Isărescu, economist and member of the Club of Rome, former Prime Minister
Mihail Lascăr, WWII general, Minister of Defense
Mihail Manoilescu, economist and Foreign Minister
Alexandru Marghiloman, Prime Minister during World War I
Gheorghe G. Mironescu, Prime Minister in interbellum Romania
David Praporgescu, general
Constantin Prezan, general in World War I, Marshal of Romania
Nicolae Rădescu, Prime Minister during World War II 
Radu R. Rosetti, general
Ecaterina Teodoroiu, soldier and heroine during World War I

National Peasants' Party 
Emil Constantinescu, former President of Romania
Corneliu Coposu, politician, National Peasants' Party
Doina Cornea, noted dissident and intellectual, National Peasants' Party
Iuliu Maniu, politician, one of the creators of the National Peasants' Party
Ion Mihalache, politician, National Peasants' Party
Ion Rațiu, politician, National Peasants' Party
Alexandru Vaida-Voevod, politician, Prime Minister of Romania, National Peasants' Party
Radu Vasile, economist and politician, former Prime Minister

National Liberal Party (1875–1950)

 Dinu Brătianu, president of the National Liberal Party, arrested and imprisoned without trial by the communists, dying in 1950, probably at Sighet Prison
 Ion C. Brătianu, Prime Minister of Romania
 Ion I. C. Brătianu, politician, one of the founders of the Liberal movement in Romania, Prime Minister, son of Ion C. Brătianu
 Vintilă Brătianu, politician, Prime Minister of Romania, son of Ion C. Brătianu
 Ion G. Duca, Prime Minister, assassinated by Iron Guard
 Ion Ghica, mathematician, diplomat, Prime Minister
 Mihail Kogălniceanu, lawyer, historian, publicist, Prime Minister, Minister of Foreign Affairs, Minister of Internal Affairs
 C. A. Rosetti, publicist, Mayor of Bucharest
 Dimitrie Sturdza, president of the National Liberal Party and president of the Romanian Academy

National Liberal Party (after 1990)
 Crin Antonescu, former leader of the party (2009–2014)
 Radu Câmpeanu, first leader of the party after the 1989 revolution
 Neagu Djuvara, former historian
 Eduard Hellvig, current director of the Romanian Intelligence Service
 Klaus Iohannis, current President of Romania, former leader of the party (2014)
 Mircea Ionescu-Quintus, leader of the party (1993–2001)
 Nicolae Manolescu, literary critic
 Siegfried Mureșan, MEP and current spokesman of the European People's Party (EPP) 
 Călin Popescu-Tăriceanu, former Prime Minister, former leader of the party (2004–2009)
 Cătălin Predoiu, lawyer, former Justice Minister
 Theodor Stolojan, former Prime Minister, leader of the party (2002–2004) 
 Mihai Răzvan Ungureanu, Minister of Foreign Affairs (2004–2007), head of Romanian Foreign Intelligence Service (2007–2012) 
 Renate Weber, former lawyer, current MEP

Romanian Communist Party 
Gheorghe Apostol, General Secretary
Alexandru Bârlădeanu
Emil Bobu 
Emil Bodnăraș
Silviu Brucan
Elena Ceaușescu, wife of Nicolae Ceaușescu
Nicolae Ceaușescu, General Secretary 
Miron Constantinescu
Gheorghe Gheorghiu-Dej, General Secretary and Prime Minister 
Petru Groza, Prime Minister
Corneliu Mănescu 
Manea Mănescu, Prime Minister
Ion Gheorghe Maurer, Prime Minister
Paul Niculescu-Mizil 
Ana Pauker 
Constantin Pîrvulescu 
Leonte Răutu
Vladimir Tismăneanu

Democratic Liberal Party 
Teodor Baconschi, former Foreign Affairs Minister
Traian Băsescu, former President of Romania and president of the Democratic Liberal Party
Emil Boc, former Prime Minister and president of the Democratic Liberal Party 
Vasile Blaga, former Internal Affairs Minister and president of the Democratic Liberal Party
Daniel Funeriu, former Education Minister
Monica Macovei, former Justice Minister
Theodor Paleologu, former Culture Minister

Social Democratic Party 
 Ana Birchall, current Justice Minister
 Titus Corlățean, former Foreign Affairs Minister
 Cristian Diaconescu, former Foreign Affairs Minister 
 Mircea Geoană, former Foreign Minister, former president of the Social Democratic Party and current deputy secretary general of NATO
 Ion Iliescu, former President of Romania, former president of the Social Democratic Party
 Adrian Năstase, former Prime Minister, former president of the Social Democratic Party 
 Victor Ponta, former Prime Minister, former president of the Social Democratic Party

Diplomats 
Bogdan Aurescu
Antoine Bibesco
Adrian Cioroianu, historian
Eugen Filotti
Grigore Gafencu 
Constantin Karadja 
Corneliu Mănescu
Teodor Meleșcanu
Alexandru Paleologu, essayist and literary critic 
Vasile Pușcaș, historian
Savel Rădulescu
Nicolae Titulescu, professor of law and former President of the General Assembly of the League of Nations (1930–32)
Constantin Vișoianu

Arts

Architecture

Dance 
Iris Barbura, dancer and choreographer
Alina Cojocaru, ballerina
Eugenia Popescu-Județ, ballerina, dance teacher, choreographer, manuscript specialist

Fashion 
Ioana Ciolacu, awarded fashion designer
Narcisa Pheres

Photography 
Costică Acsinte
Iosif Berman
Alexandra Croitoru
Samoilă Mârza

Sculpture 
Constantin Brâncuși
Oscar Han
Ion Irimescu
Ion Jalea
Ana Lupaș
Cornel Medrea
Paul Neagu
Mihai Olos
Dimitrie Paciurea
Milița Petrașcu
Marilena Preda-Sânc
Marian Zidaru

Writing 
Vasile Alecsandri, poet and playwright
Lucian Blaga, philosopher, poet, playwright
Ion Luca Caragiale
Andrei Codrescu, poet and essayist
Nichita Danilov, poet, essayist, novelist
Nae Ionescu, philosopher, writer, logician
Virgil Nemoianu, essayist, literary critic, philosopher of culture
Horia-Roman Patapievici, writer, philosopher, essayist
Bogdan Petriceicu-Hasdeu, philologist, linguist
Ion Pillat, poet, publicist, academic
Andrei Pleșu, writer, philosopher, essayist, journalist
Dumitru Radu Popescu, novelist, essayist, playwright
Marin Sorescu, poet, playwright
Nichita Stănescu, poet and playwright
Petre Țuțea
Vasile Voiculescu, poet, writer, playwright

Philosophers 
Petre Andrei, philosopher
Lucian Blaga, philosopher, poet, playwright
Emil Cioran, essayist, philosopher
Vasile Conta, philosopher
Mircea Eliade, philosopher
Mircea Florian, philosopher
Nae Ionescu, orthodox philosopher
Stéphane Lupasco, philosopher
Constantin Noica, philosopher
Theodor Paleologu, politician, philosopher
Camil Petrescu, essayist, philosopher, writer
Dumitru D. Roșca, philosopher, professor
Petre Țuțea, philosopher
Tudor Vianu, philosopher of culture, critic, writer

Poets 

Vasile Alecsandri, playwright, poet and revolutionary
Grigore Alexandrescu, poet
Ioan Alexandru, poet and political figure
Bartolomeu Anania, poet and clerical figure
Dimitrie Anghel, poet and playwright
Tudor Arghezi, poet, journalist
Céline Arnauld, poet (French language)
Anatol E. Baconsky, poet
George Bacovia, poet
Vasile Baghiu, novelist and poet
Cezar Baltag, poet and essayist
Ion Barbu, poet and mathematician
Mihai Beniuc, poet and Communist Party figure
Lucian Blaga, poet, philosopher, playwright, translator
Ana Blandiana, poet, journalist
Eta Boeriu, poet, literary critic, translator
Geo Bogza, poet, journalist
Dimitrie Bolintineanu, novelist, poet, and revolutionary
Cezar Bolliac, poet and revolutionary
Emil Botta, actor, poet
Emil Brumaru, poet
Scarlat Cantacuzino, poet, essayist and diplomat
Ion Caraion, poet
Vasile Cârlova, poet
Magda Cârneci, poet, art critic and historian
Mircea Cărtărescu, poet, essayist
Nina Cassian, poet, translator (+English language)
Paul Celan, poet (German language)
George Coșbuc, poet, translator
Traian T. Coșovei, poet
Aron Cotruș, poet
Nichifor Crainic, essayist, poet, journalist, theologian, and political figure
Nichita Danilov, poet
Leonid Dimov, poet
Mircea Dinescu, poet, journalist
Ștefan Augustin Doinaș, poet, translator and political figure
Geo Dumitrescu, poet
Mihai Eminescu, poet, essayist, journalist
Șerban Foarță, poet, essayist, translator
Benjamin Fondane, poet, essayist (+French language)
Emilian Galaicu-Păun, poet, essayist and novelist
Octavian Goga, poet and political figure
Radu Gyr, poet
Iulia Hasdeu, poet
Ion Heliade-Rădulescu, poet and revolutionary
Ștefan Octavian Iosif, poet, translator
Isidore Isou, poet
Nora Iuga, poet
Mircea Ivănescu, poet and translator
Eugen Jebeleanu, poet
Claudiu Komartin, poet and translator
Nicolae Labiș, poet
Leonida Lari, poet and political figure
Irving Layton, poet
Gherasim Luca, poet
Alexandru Macedonski, poet
Adrian Maniu, poet
Angela Marinescu, poet
Dumitru Matcovschi, poet
Virgil Mazilescu, poet
Ion Minulescu, poet and novelist
Andrei Mureșanu, poet and revolutionary
Alexandru Mușina, poet, essayist and translator
Gellu Naum, poet, playwright and translator
Sașa Pană, poet
Oskar Pastior, poet (German language)
Adrian Păunescu, poet and political figure
Cristian Popescu, poet
Marin Sorescu, poet and novelist
Radu Stanca, director, playwright, poet and essayist
Nichita Stănescu, poet, essayist, translator
Valeriu Sterian, singer-songwriter
Constant Tonegaru, poet
George Topîrceanu, poet
Tristan Tzara, poet (+French language)
Grigore Vieru, poet
Ion Vinea, poet
Matei Vișniec, playwright and poet (+French language)
Gelu Vlașin, poet
Vasile Voiculescu, poet
Ilarie Voronca, poet (+French language)

Writers 

Gabriela Adameșteanu
Radu Aldulescu
George Bălăiță
Eugen Barbu
Marthe Bibesco, writer (+French language)
Nicolae Breban
Augustin Buzura
Ion Luca Caragiale, playwright
Mateiu Caragiale, novelist
Mircea Cărtărescu, writer, essayist
Pavel Chihaia
George Coandă, writer, historian, novelist and poet
Ioan Mihai Cochinescu, writer, essayist
Gheorghe Crăciun
Ion Creangă, writer, especially of children's stories
Ioan Petru Culianu, historian of religion
Petru Dumitriu
Mircea Eliade, historian of religion; also novelist
Mihail Fărcășanu, writer, novelist
Nicolae Filimon
Filip Florian
Virgil Gheorghiu, novelist
Paul Goma, writer
Anton Holban
Vintilă Horia, prominent writer( +French language)
Eugène Ionesco, playwright (+French language)
Petre Ispirescu, writer
Panait Istrati, novelist (+French language)
Claudiu Komartin
Gabriel Liiceanu, writer, publi
Herta Müller, writer (German language), 2009 Nobel Prize in Literature
Mircea Nedelciu
Bujor Nedelcovici
Hortensia Papadat-Bengescu
Camil Petrescu
Cezar Petrescu
Radu Petrescu
Vasile Pogor, writer
Marin Preda, novelist
Doina Ruști, novelist
Liviu Rebreanu, writer
Mihail Sadoveanu, novelist
Dinu Săraru
Mihail Sebastian, writer, playwright
Ioan Slavici
Bogdan Suceavă
Lucian Dan Teodorovici
Dumitru Țepeneag, novelist (+French language)
Nicolae Iorga, historian, politician
Nicolae Milescu, writer, diplomat
Urmuz, writer
Richard Wagner, writer 
Elie Wiesel, Romanian-born American writer, professor, Nobel laureate, and Holocaust survivor

Literary critics 
George Călinescu
Matei Călinescu
Paul Cernat
Mihai Cimpoi
Șerban Cioculescu
Pompiliu Constantinescu
Ovid S. Crohmălniceanu
Constantin Dobrogeanu-Gherea
Garabet Ibrăileanu
Virgil Ierunca
Eugen Lovinescu
Titu Maiorescu
Nicolae Manolescu
Ovidiu Papadima
Edgar Papu
Ovidiu Pecican
Perpessicius

Historians 
Gheorghe I. Brătianu
George Călinescu
Constantin Daicoviciu
Nicolae Densușianu
Constantin C. Giurescu
Neagu Djuvara
Adrian Cioroianu
Dinu C. Giurescu, Member of the American Romanian Academy of Arts and Sciences and Member of the Romanian Academy since 2002.
Nicolae Iorga
Vasile Pârvan
A. D. Xenopol
Alexandru Zub

Journalists 
Teodor Brateș, radio host and television journalist
Ion Cristoiu
Eugen Filotti, journalist, Director of the Press
Leonard Miron, journalist and Romanian National TV presenter
Cristian Tudor Popescu, journalist and science-fiction writer
Pamfil Șeicaru, journalist (Gândirea, Bucovina) member of Romanian Parliament, Director of Curentul

Linguists 
Eugenio Coșeriu
Iorgu Iordan
I.C. Massim
Emil Petrovici

Music 

See also Music of Romania, especially for contemporary pop musicians.

Composers 

Ana-Maria Avram, composer
Pascal Bentoiu, composer
Tiberiu Brediceanu, composer and conductor
Nicolae Bretan, opera composer
Eduard Caudella, composer
Paul Constantinescu, composer
Dimitrie Cuclin, composer
Constantin Dimitrescu, composer, cellist
Sabin Dragoi, composer
Iancu Dumitrescu, composer, conductor, musicologist
George Enescu, composer, violinist, pianist, conductor, teacher
Iosif Ivanovici
Dinu Lipatti
Liviu Marinescu, composer
Octavian Nemescu, composer
Ștefan Niculescu, composer
Nonna Otescu, composer
Anton Pann, composer
Ciprian Porumbescu, composer
Horațiu Rădulescu, composer
Octave Octavian Teodorescu, composer
Cornel Trailescu, composer
Iannis Xenakis, composer born in Romania

Musicians 

Dan Andrei Aldea, rock guitarist, composer, singer
Christian Badea, conductor
Lucian Ban, jazz composer & pianist
Carla's Dreams, singer-, musician
Sergiu Celibidache, orchestra conductor
Nicole Cherry, singer 
Connect-R, rapper
Marius Constant, originator of the Twilight Zone theme
Marin Constantin, conductor
Nicu Covaci, rock guitarist, composer, vocalist
Michael Cretu, musician founder of (Enigma)
Grigoraș Dinicu, violinist, composer
Adrian Erlandsson, drummer (At the Gates), Swedish with Romanian background
Daniel Erlandsson, drummer (Arch Enemy), Swedish with Romanian background
George Georgescu, orchestra conductor
Valeriu Găină, guitarist
Tudor Gheorghe, musician, composer and singer
Nicolae Guță, singer
Clara Haskil, pianist
Hugo Jan Huss, orchestra conductor and violinist
Antonia Iacobescu, singer
Inna, singer-songwriter, dancer
Ovidiu Lipan, drummer (Phoenix)
Dinu Lipatti, pianist, composer
Radu Lupu, pianist
Ion Marin, conductor
Cristi Minculescu, rock singer and composer
Jonel (Ionel) Perlea, conductor
Valentin Radu, conductor
Florin Salam, singer 
Constantin Silvestri, orchestra conductor and composer
Alexandra Stan, singer, musician, entertainer, model, dancer
Laura Stoica, pop-rock singer and composer
Octave Octavian Teodorescu, composer, vanguard rock musician, multi-instrumentist (guitars, keyboards, programmable instruments)
Cristian Vasile, tango singer
Dorin Liviu Zaharia, composer and singer
Gheorghe Zamfir, pan flute musician

Classic 
Zeno Costa, tenor
Ileana Cotrubaș, soprano
Hariclea Darclée, soprano
Angela Gheorghiu, soprano
Dinu Lipatti, pianist and composer
Radu Lupu, pianist
Nelly Miricioiu, soprano
Mariana Nicolescu, soprano
Mihaela Ursuleasa, pianist
Leontina Vaduva, soprano
Virginia Zeani, soprano

Folk and derivatives 
Maria Tănase, Romanian popular music singer

Instruments 
Alexander Bălănescu, violinist
Ion Miu, cimbalom player
Johnny Răducanu, jazz pianist
Ion Voicu, violinist
Gheorghe Zamfir, panpipes player

Pop and techno 
Nicoleta Alexandru, pop and techno singer
Loredana Groza, pop singer
 Gabriela and Mihaela Modorcea, twins sisters comprising the duo Indiggo

Film and theatre 

Mircea Albulescu, actor
Ștefan Bănică, Jr., actor
Monica Bârlădeanu, actress
Radu Beligan, actor, director
Joana Benedek, actress
Ion Luca Caragiale, playwright
Ion Caramitru, actor
Ion Cojar, acting teacher, founder of the Romanian method acting school
Gheorghe Dinică, actor
Maria Filotti, actress
Marcel Iureș, actor
Cătălin Mitulescu, film director
Maia Morgenstern, actress
Cristian Mungiu, director of 4 Months, 3 Weeks and 2 Days
Jean Negulescu, film director, Oscar nominee
Sergiu Nicolaescu, film director
Amza Pellea, actor
Florin Piersic, actor
Florian Pittiș, actor
Alina Plugaru, pornographic actress
Elvira Popescu, actress
Corneliu Porumboiu, film director
Cristi Puiu, film director
Victor Rebengiuc, actor
Edward G. Robinson, actor
Alec Secăreanu, actor
Sebastian Stan, actor
Saviana Stănescu, playwright
Constantin Tănase, cabaretist, comic and poet, shot by the soviet army of occupation in Bucharest, in 1945
Grigore Vasiliu Birlic, actor
Johnny Weissmuller, actor

Religion 
Teoctist Arăpașu, Patriarch of the Romanian Orthodox Church
Arsenie Boca
Daniel Ciobotea, incumbent Patriarch of the Romanian Orthodox Church
Miron Cristea, first Patriarch of the Romanian Orthodox Church
Iuliu Hossu, Greek-Catholic bishop of the Cluj-Gherla Diocese and later cardinal
Justinian Marina, Patriarch of the Romanian Orthodox Church
Iustin Moisescu, Patriarch of the Romanian Orthodox Church
Nicodim Munteanu, Patriarch of the Romanian Orthodox Church
 Lucian Mureșan, Greek-Catholic Metropolitan bishop, later (and incumbent) Major Archbishop of the Archdiocese of Făgăraș and Alba Iulia
Dumitru Stăniloae, priest, translated the Philokalia into Romanian
Vasile Suciu, Greek-Catholic Metropolitan bishop of the Archdiocese of Făgăraș and Alba Iulia
Alexandru Todea, Greek-Catholic Metropolitan bishop of the Archdiocese of Făgăraș and Alba Iulia and later cardinal
Lucian Turcescu, Orthodox theologian teaching at Concordia University (Montreal, Canada), president of the Canadian Society of Patristic Studies, 2004–2008
Richard Wurmbrand, pastor, author of Tortured for Christ

Sports

Swimming 
 David Popovici

Athletics 
 Iolanda Balaș, high jump
 Violeta Beclea-Szekely
 Paula Ivan
 Lia Manoliu, discus thrower
 Doina Melinte, 3000 m
 Gabriela Szabo

Basketball 
 Ernie Grunfeld (born 1955), NBA guard/forward & GM, Olympic champion
 Tal Karpelesz (born 1990), Israeli-Romanian basketball player
 Gheorghe Mureșan

Boxing 
Lucian Bute
Adrian Diaconu
Leonard Doroftei
Florian Munteanu
Mihai Leu
Francisc Vaștag
 Victor Zilberman, Olympic welterweight boxer, bronze medal

Canoe 
 Leon Rotman, sprint canoer, 2-time Olympic champion (C-1 10,000 meter, C-1 1,000-meter) and bronze (C-1 1,000-meter), 14 national titles

Chess 
[Daniel Lapusan]

Football 

Ioan Andone
Ilie Balaci
Ladislau Bölöni
Cristian Chivu
Cosmin Contra
Nicolae Dică
Nicolae Dobrin
Helmuth Duckadam
Ilie Dumitrescu
Ioan Viorel Ganea
Dorin Goian 
Gheorghe Hagi
Cătălin Hâldan
Adrian Ilie
Anghel Iordănescu
Emerich Jenei
Michael Klein
Miodrag Belodedici
Marius Lăcătuș
Mircea Lucescu
Silviu Lung
Viorel Moldovan
Dorinel Munteanu
Adrian Mutu
Gheorghe Popescu
Florin Răducioiu
Ioan Sabău
Bogdan Stelea

Gymnastics 

Simona Amânar
Oana Ban
Octavian Belu, women's coach
Mihai Brestyan, gymnastics coach
Sabina Cojocar
Nadia Comăneci
Laura Cutina
Aurelia Dobre
Marian Drăgulescu
Emilia Eberle
Gina Gogean
Sandra Izbașa
Marta Károlyi, gymnastics coach
Alexandra Marinescu
Lavinia Miloșovici
Aura Andreea Munteanu
Steliana Nistor
Maria Olaru
Cătălina Ponor
Claudia Presăcan
Andreea Răducan
Monica Roșu
Daniela Silivaș
Nicoleta Daniela Șofronie
Ioan Silviu Suciu
Ecaterina Szabo
Corina Ungureanu
Teodora Ungureanu
Marius Urzică

Ivey 
Julia Ionescu
Victor Zega

Rowing 
Constanța Burcică
Georgeta Damian
Elena Georgescu
Doina Ignat
Elisabeta Lipă
Ivan Patzaichin
Viorica Susanu

Tennis 

Irina Bara
Irina-Camelia Begu
Ana Bogdan
Mihaela Buzarnescu
Alexandra Cadanțu
Sorana Cîrstea
Marius Copil
Jaqueline Cristian
Ruxandra Dragomir
Alexandra Dulgheru
Edina Gallovits
Simona Halep, 2018 French Open winner, 2019 Wimbledon Winner
Victor Hănescu
Gabriela Lee
Florin Mergea
Andreea Mitu
Ilie Năstase, 1972 French Open winner, 1973 US Open winner 
Monica Niculescu
Ioana Raluca Olaru
Dinu Pescariu
Magda Rurac
Gabriela Ruse
Virginia Ruzici, 1978 French Open winner
Răzvan Sabău
Irina Spîrlea
Horia Tecău
Patricia Maria Țig
Ion Țiriac, also a businessman
Adrian Ungur

Other sports 
 Laura Badea (born 1970), Romanian fencer and Olympic champion in foil competition
 Luminița Dinu-Huțupan handball player
Mathew Dumba (born 1994), NHL ice hockey player
 Alina Dumitru, Olympic judo champion
Yohan Kende (born 1949), Israeli Olympic swimmer
 Alina Popa, IFBB professional bodybuilder
 Angelica Rozeanu (Adelstin; 1921–2006), Romanian-Israeli 17-time world table tennis champion; ITTF Hall of Fame
Andre Spitzer (1945–1972), Israel's 1972 Summer Olympics fencing coach and victim of the Munich massacre
Timea Toth (born 1968), Romanian-born Israeli Olympic swimmer

Science

Astronomy 
Cristiana Dumitrache

Biology 
Grigore Antipa, hydrobiologist
Ana Aslan, geriatrics researcher
Victor Babeș, biologist
Dimitrie Brândză, botanist
Ioan Cantacuzino, microbiologist
Melania Cristescu, biologist
Wilhelm Knechtel, botanist
Nicolae Leon, biologist
Gheorghe Marinescu, neurologist
Nicolae Minovici, forensic scientist
Mina Minovici, forensic scientist
George Emil Palade, 1974 Nobel Prize in Physiology or Medicine winner
Constantin Parhon, endocrinologist
Nicolae Paulescu, discovered insulin
Emil Racoviță, biologist and speleologist

Chemistry 
Lazăr Edeleanu, chemist
Henrik Kacser, physical chemist
Costin Nenițescu, founder of the Romanian school of Organic Chemistry
Nicolae Teclu, inventor of the Teclu gas burner

Physicians 
Raed Arafat, founder of SMURD (a Syrian-born Palestinian refugee living in Romania since 1981)
Bazil Assan, engineer, explorer and economist
Adrian Bejan, namesake of the Bejan number
Gheorghe Benga, physician and molecular biologist
Alexandru Ciurcu, inventor, with M.M. Just Buisson, of the first reactive engine
George Constantinescu, inventor
Leon Dănăilă, neurosurgeon
Daniel David, professor, psychologist, and psychotherapist
Carol Davila, physician
Anastase Dragomir, inventor of the parachute cell, predecessor of the ejection seat
Dimitrie Gerota , anatomist, physician, radiologist, urologist
Rodrig Goliescu, inventor of the first airplane with a tubular fuselage
Iuliu Hațieganu, internist doctor
Petrache Poenaru, inventor
Elie Radu, architect, engineer
Anghel Saligny, engineer
Nicolae Vasilescu-Karpen, engineer
David Wechsler, psychologist

Aerospace 
Elie Carafoli, aeronautics engineer
Henri Coandă, aircraft designer and discoverer of the Coanda effect of fluidics
Aurel Vlaicu, flight pioneer
Traian Vuia

Astronauts 
Dumitru Prunariu, Romania's first and only cosmonaut

Mathematics 

Titu Andreescu
Emanoil Bacaloglu
Dan Barbilian
Alexandra Bellow
Julius Borcea
Liliana Borcea
Cristian S. Calude
Ana Caraiani
Zoia Ceaușescu
Alina Carmen Cojocaru
Nicușor Dan
Anton Davidoglu
Cornelia Druțu
Ciprian Foias
Alexandru Froda
Tudor Ganea
Ion Ghica
Alexandru Ghika
Emil Grosswald
Spiru Haret
Caius Iacob
Adrian Ioana
Eleny Ionel
Cassius Ionescu-Tulcea
Sergiu Klainerman
Traian Lalescu
Florian Luca
Alexandru Lupaș
George Lusztig
Ciprian Manolescu
Solomon Marcus
George Marinescu
Octav Mayer
Preda Mihăilescu
Gheorghe Mihoc
Irina Mitrea
Petru Mocanu
Grigore Moisil, Member of the Romanian Academy
Elena Moldovan Popoviciu
Gheorghe Moroșanu
Henri Moscovici
Mircea Mustață
Miron Nicolescu, Member of the Romanian Academy
Octav Onicescu
Magda Peligrad
Valentin Poénaru
Dimitrie Pompeiu
Florian Pop
Mihnea Popa
Sorin Popa
Cristian Dumitru Popescu
Nicolae Popescu, Member of the Romanian Academy
Tiberiu Popoviciu
Tudor Ratiu
Ovidiu Savin
Rodica Simion
Simion Stoilow
Ileana Streinu
Bogdan Suceavă
Gabriel Sudan
Daniel Tătaru
Gheorghe Țițeica, Member of the Romanian Academy
Monica Vișan
Dan-Virgil Voiculescu
Gheorghe Vrănceanu
Alexandru Zaharescu

Physics 
Réka Albert
Emanoil Bacaloglu, physicist, chemist and mathematician
Victor Albert Bailey, physicist (Romanian on his mother's side)
Radu Dan Constantinescu, physicist, President of the Balkan Physical Union
Peter George Oliver Freund, physicist
Mihai Gavrilă, theoretical quantum physicist, professor, Corresponding Member of the Romanian Academy
Horia Hulubei, atomic physicist, professor, Member of the Romanian Academy
Theodor V. Ionescu, plasma physicist, professor, Member of the Romanian Academy
Ștefania Mărăcineanu
Alexandru Marin, physicist, professor
Victor Mercea
Florentina I. Mosora, biophysicist and nuclear medicine professor, Member of the Royal Academy of Belgium
Horațiu Năstase
Ioan-Iovitz Popescu
Alexandru Proca, theoretical physicist, Member of the Romanian Academy
Ștefan Procopiu, theoretical physicist, Member of the Romanian Academy
Șerban Țițeica, theoretical physicist, founder of the Romanian modern school of theoretical physics, Member of the Romanian Academy

Computer science 
Andrei Alexandrescu, computer scientist
Mihai Nadin, computer scientist
Ștefan Odobleja, scientist, precursor of cybernetics
Mihai Pătrașcu, computer scientist
Ion Stoica, computer scientist
Victor Toma, computer engineer, born in Romanian Bessarabia
Matei Zaharia, computer scientist

Others 
 Dionisie Ghermani (1922–2009), professor, writer, philanthropist, and political activist
 Dimitrie Gusti, sociologist
 Ernest Krausz (1931–2018), Israeli professor of sociology and President at Bar Ilan University
 David Mitrany (1888–1975), political theorist
 George Pomutz (1818–1882), ethnic Romanian United States general in the Civil War, and a diplomat
 Emil Racoviță, polar explorer
 Emilia Săulea (1904–1998), geologist and paleontologist.
 Ruxandra Sireteanu (1945—2008), neuroscientist
 Henri Stahl, stenographer
 Henri H. Stahl, cultural anthropologist, ethnographer, sociologist, social historian

Polymaths 
 Simion Bărnuțiu, jurist, priest, politician, publicist, lawyer, writer, professor
 Matila Ghyka, famous polymath, mathematician and author
 Mihail Kogălniceanu, lawyer, historian, publicist, politician, cultural peacemaker
 Bogdan Suceavă, mathematician, novelist, journalist, professor of mathematics at California State University, Fullerton

Business 
Octav Botnar, Nissan UK chairman, billionaire
Iosif Constantin Drăgan, gas tycoon, billionaire and academic
John DeLorean, US car industry executive, engineer, inventor of Pontiac GTO Muscle car and DeLorean
Dinu Patriciu, former CEO of Rompetrol
Dan Petrescu, businessman and billionaire
Anastasia Soare billionaire, the CEO and founder of Anastasia Beverly Hills

Military

Miscellaneous 
Ana Cumpănaș (a.k.a. Anna Sage), the "Woman in Red" who helped FBI catch John Dillinger
Iana Matei, activist and founder of Reaching Out

List of Romanians who were born outside present-day Romania
This is a list of Romanians who were born outside present-day Romania.

Austria
Victor Babeș, physician, biologist, bacteriologist

Republic of Moldova
Ștefan Baștovoi, orthodox monk
Maria Cebotari, opera singer
Emil Constantinescu, president of Romania (1996–2000)
Eugenio Coșeriu, linguist
Paul Goma, writer
Lia Manoliu, athlete
Adrian Păunescu, poet, politician

Russia
 Alexander Kolchak, partially Romanian, descendant of Iliaș Colceag, Russian Admiral; Supreme Ruler of Russia (White Guard State) (1918–1920)

Serbia
Zoran Lilić, president of the Federal Republic of Yugoslavia, 1993–1997
Baba Novac, captain under Mihai Viteazul and hajduk
Vasko Popa, poet
Emil Petrovici, linguist

Ukraine
Alexandru Averescu, prime minister of Romania (1918, 1920–1921, 1926–1927)
Bogdan Petriceicu Hasdeu, philologist, writer
Lucian Pintilie, film director, screenwriter
Sofia Rotaru, singer
Nicolae Văcăroiu, prime minister of Romania (1992–1996)
Sofia Vicoveanca, singer

See also 

 List of Romanian inventors and discoverers
 List of Romanian-Americans
 List of Aromanians
 List of people by nationality

References